The Faculty of Medicine Ramathibodi Hospital, Mahidol University has long been regarded as Thailand's most prestigious medical school.

History 
Following the Second National Economic and Social Development Plan (1964–1966), the Thai government aimed to increase the number of doctors and nurses in order to meet the needs of the country. In August 1964, the government cabinet approved the plan of setting up a new medical school which would be located around the Phaya Thai area, on the Thung Phaya Thai grounds owned by the Treasury Department and located opposite the Ministry of Industry. Furthermore, a new hospital called was also to be built on the site. On December 30, 1965, HM King Bhumibol Adulyadej graciously conferred upon the name of this new medical school “Ramathibodi” and laid the foundation stone for the faculty and hospital's buildings, as well as officially enrolling the first cohort of medical students at the Faculty of Science. Four years later, the King opened the new faculty and hospital on May 3, 1969 and patient admission started three days later. Apart from the government's fund, the faculty was financially and academically supported by the Rockefeller Foundation of the United States. Since then the Faculty of Medicine Ramathibodi Hospital has been fully equipped and has provided medical education and services as well as research facilities to the public.

The Faculty of Medicine Ramathibodi Hospital is one of two main medical schools within Mahidol University. The other older school is the Faculty of Medicine Siriraj Hospital, Mahidol University.

About 

The hospital is located on Rama 6 Road, close to Chitralada Royal Villa. There are 3 main health servicing buildings (Building 1, Queen Sirikit Building, and Somdech Phra Debaratana Building) on the medical school campus which serve at least 5,000 out-patient visits per day and in-patients with more than 1,000 beds for tertiary medical care. It is served by Ramathibodi Hospital Railway Halt, operated by the State Railway of Thailand. There are dormitories and sports facilities for medical students located on-site.

Chakri Naruebodindra Medical Institute (CNMI)

In 2010, the Faculty of Medicine Ramathibodi Hospital launched a new project, named the Chakri Naruebodindra Medical Institute (CNMI) as a center for medical excellence in Asia to celebrate the 84th Anniversary of King Bhumibol Adulyadej's birthday. The project approximately costed 6 billion Baht and is located in Bang Phli District, Samut Prakan Province. The institute opened on the 25th of December 2017 and was attended by Princess Maha Chakri Sirindhorn.

Departments
Department of Anesthesiology
Department of Clinical Epidemiology and Biostatistics
Department of Communication Science and Disorders
Department of Community Medicine
Department of Diagnostic and Therapeutic Radiology
Division of Emergency Medicine
Department of Family Medicine
Department of Internal Medicine
Department of Obstetrics and Gynecology
Department of Ophthalmology
Department of Orthopedics
Department of Otolaryngology
Department of Pathology
Department of Pediatrics
Department of Psychiatry
Department of Rehabilitation Medicine
Department of Surgery
School of Nursing	
Research Center
Medical Education and Student Affairs
Graduate Program In Nutrition Group

Education 
The faculty offers a range of courses including the following:

Apart from regular programs, the faculty also offers numerous resident specialty programs, sub-specialty programs, and fellowship programs.

Medicine 

Ramathibodi develops the American style of study due to assistance from the Rockefeller Foundation during its founding period. The medical course aims to produce competent doctors with high professionalism, strong communication, teamwork, leadership and interpersonal skills. There is also an emphasis on research. High school students compete in an extremely competitive entrance examination and grueling interview process. Since 2017, the faculty was one of the first institutions in Thailand to use BMAT testing as part of student admissions for some entry quotas. The acceptance rate was 0.8% as of the 2017 academic year. For the 2018 academic year, a total of 180 undergraduate medical (RAMD) students were accepted into the course at the Faculty of Medicine Ramathibodi Hospital.

Medicine at the faculty is a six-year course. The first year consists of basic sciences, the second and third years consist of preclinical medical sciences, and the fourth to sixth years consist of clinical training. Until the 2019 academic year, the first year was taught at the Salaya Campus, the second and third years were taught at the Faculty of Science, Mahidol University at Phaya Thai Campus and clinical training was mainly based at Ramathibodi Hospital, with some ward rotations at CNMI and affiliated provincial hospitals. From the 2020 academic year, first year students remain at Salaya while medical students are mainly based at CNMI throughout second to sixth year with some ward rotations at Ramathibodi Hospital and affiliated provincial hospitals.

A joint-degree "MD-M.Eng" 7-year program was introduced since 2020, in cooperation with the Faculty of Engineering, Mahidol University, and students receive an additional Master of Engineering (Biomedical Engineering) at the end of the program. Another joint degree "MD-MM" 7-year program was introduced since 2021, in cooperation with the College of Management, Mahidol University, and students receive an additional Master of Management degree at the end of the program. Furthermore, some students may also be selected complete a PhD prior to entering clinical years; completion of the medical course dependent on the duration taken for their dissertation.

Since 2017, the Faculty of Medicine Ramathibodi Hospital has agreed with the HRH Princess Chulabhorn College of Medical Science for the medicine course (PCMD) to provide educational facilities for students for five cohorts. Around 30 PCMD students study together with RAMD students throughout the six-year medicine course.

Main Teaching Hospitals
 Ramathibodi Hospital
 Chakri Naruebodindra Medical Institute

Affiliated Teaching Hospitals 

 Maharat Nakhon Ratchasima Hospital, Nakhon Ratchasima Province
 Buriram Hospital, Buriram Province
 Chao Phraya Yommarat Hospital, Suphan Buri Province
 Phra Nakhon Si Ayutthaya Hospital, Phra Nakhon Si Ayutthaya Province

See also
List of medical schools in Thailand

References

External links

Ramathibodi
Ramathibodi
University departments in Thailand